Stratton is a brand of powder compacts, lipstick holders and other devices and containers for cosmetics, made  in Birmingham, England. the company also made costume jewellery.

The parent company was founded in 1860 as Stratnoid, and initially made knitting needles. It changed its name to Stratton and in 1920, merged with Jarrett and Rainsford, to form a company named Jarrett, Rainsford and Laughton Ltd., trading as Stratton and as Stratton of Mayfair.

In 1923, the company began assembling compacts, using components imported from the United States.

In 1929, the company was headquartered at its Alexandra Works, Kent Street, Birmingham, with showrooms in Hamsell Street, Jewin Street, London, EC2.

By the early 1930s, it was making its own components in Birmingham, and producing half of all the compacts made in the United Kingdom.

In November 1940, during World War II, four of its five Birmingham factories were lost to enemy bombing. The company recovered and diverted its work to producing war supplies.

By 1947, the company was operating from the Leominster Works, Lower Essex Street, Birmingham, and had showrooms at Dean Street, London, W1.

In 1948, the company patented a mechanism for a self-opening inner lid for compacts. During subsequent years, it acquired rivals including Kigu and Mascot.

A new factory at Warstock Road, Birmingham, was acquired. The company changed hands several times before finally closing in 1997, but the name was revived subsequently and the company using it is still in operation, again assembling imported components.

References 

1860 establishments in England
History of Birmingham, West Midlands
Cosmetics brands